Hassan Abu Sharara (born 3 May 1997), he is a Saudi Arabian football player who currently plays as a winger for Al-Qadisiyah.

References

External links
 

Living people
1997 births
People from Jizan Province
Association football midfielders
Saudi Arabian footballers
Al-Qadsiah FC players
Al-Kawkab FC players
Saudi Professional League players
Saudi First Division League players
Saudi Arabia youth international footballers